The 28th United States Congress was a meeting of the legislative branch of the United States federal government, consisting of the United States Senate and the United States House of Representatives. It met in Washington, D.C. from March 4, 1843, to March 4, 1845, during the third and fourth years of John Tyler's presidency. The apportionment of seats in this House of Representatives was based on the 1840 United States census. The Senate had a Whig majority, and the House had a Democratic majority.

Major events

 May 24, 1844: The first electrical telegram was sent by Samuel F. B. Morse from the U.S. Capitol to the B&O Railroad "outer depot" in Baltimore, Maryland, saying "What hath God wrought".
 December 4, 1844: U.S. presidential election, 1844: James K. Polk defeated Henry Clay

Major legislation

 January 23, 1845: Presidential Election Day Act, ch. 1, 
 March 3, 1845: For the first time, Congress overrode a Presidential veto.  An act relating to revenue cutters and steamers was thereby enacted as the last Act of the 28th Congress: session II, ch. 78, .

Treaties 
 July 3, 1844: Treaty of Wanghia signed (first diplomatic agreement between China and the United States)

States admitted 
 March 1, 1845: Resolution for the Annexation of Texas,  (Admitted in the next Congress, December 29, 1845.)
 March 3, 1845: Florida admitted, .  The statute also allowed for the provisional admission of Iowa, pending a referendum in that state.  (Admitted in the next Congress, December 28, 1846.)

Party summary

Senate 
During this congress, two Senate seats were added for the new state of Florida.

House of Representatives
Following the 1840 United States Census, Congress reapportioned the House to include 223 seats.  During this congress, one House seat was added for the new state of Florida.

Leadership

Senate 
President: Vacant
President pro tempore: Willie P. Mangum (W)

House of Representatives 
Speaker: John W. Jones (D)

Members
This list is arranged by chamber, then by state. Senators are listed by class, and representatives are listed by district.

Senate

Senators were elected by the state legislatures every two years, with one-third beginning new six-year terms with each Congress. Preceding the names in the list below are Senate class numbers, which indicate the cycle of their election. In this Congress, Class 1 meant their term ended with this Congress, requiring reelection in 1844; Class 2 meant their term began in the last Congress, requiring reelection in 1846; and Class 3 meant their term began in this Congress, requiring reelection in 1848.
Skip to House of Representatives, below

Alabama 
 2. William R. King (D), until April 15, 1844
 Dixon H. Lewis (D), from April 22, 1844
 3. Arthur P. Bagby (D)

Arkansas 
 2. William S. Fulton (D), until August 15, 1844
 Chester Ashley (D), from November 8, 1844
 3. Ambrose H. Sevier (D)

Connecticut 
 1. Jabez W. Huntington (W)
 3. John M. Niles (D)

Delaware 
 1. Richard H. Bayard (W)
 2. Thomas Clayton (W)

Florida 
 1: Vacant from March 3, 1845 admission
 2: Vacant from March 3, 1845 admission

Georgia 
 2. John MacPherson Berrien (W)
 3. Walter T. Colquitt (D)

Illinois 
 2. Samuel McRoberts (D), until March 27, 1843
 James Semple (D), from December 4, 1843
 3. Sidney Breese (D)

Indiana 
 1. Albert S. White (W)
 3. Edward A. Hannegan (D)

Kentucky 
 2. James T. Morehead (W)
 3. John J. Crittenden (W)

Louisiana 
 2. Alexander Barrow (W)
 3. Alexander Porter (W), until January 13, 1844
 Henry Johnson (W), from February 12, 1844

Maine 
 1. John Fairfield (D), from December 4, 1843
 2. George Evans (W)

Maryland 
 1. William D. Merrick (W)
 3. James A. Pearce (W)

Massachusetts 
 1. Rufus Choate (W)
 2. Isaac C. Bates (W)

Michigan 
 1. Augustus S. Porter (W)
 2. William Woodbridge (W)

Mississippi 
 1. John Henderson (W)
 2. Robert J. Walker (D)

Missouri 
 1. Thomas H. Benton (D)
 3. Lewis F. Linn (D), until October 3, 1843
 David R. Atchison (D), from October 14, 1843

New Hampshire 
 2. Levi Woodbury (D)
 3. Charles G. Atherton (D)

New Jersey 
 1. William L. Dayton (W)
 2. Jacob W. Miller (W)

New York 
 1. Nathaniel P. Tallmadge (W), until June 17, 1844
 Daniel S. Dickinson (D), from November 30, 1844
 3. Silas Wright Jr. (D), until November 26, 1844
 Henry A. Foster (D), November 30, 1844 – January 27, 1845
 John A. Dix (D), from January 27, 1845

North Carolina 
 2. Willie P. Mangum (W)
 3. William H. Haywood Jr. (D)

Ohio 
 1. Benjamin Tappan (D)
 3. William Allen (D)

Pennsylvania 
 1. Daniel Sturgeon (D)
 3. James Buchanan (D)

Rhode Island 
 1. William Sprague (W), until January 17, 1844
 John B. Francis (LO), from January 25, 1844
 2. James F. Simmons (W)

South Carolina 
 2. Daniel E. Huger (D), until March 3, 1845
 3. George McDuffie (D)

Tennessee 
 1. Ephraim H. Foster (W), from October 17, 1843
 2. Spencer Jarnagin (W), from October 17, 1843

Vermont 
 1. Samuel S. Phelps (W)
 3. William Upham (W)

Virginia 
 1. William C. Rives (W)
 2. William S. Archer (W)

House of Representatives
Representatives are listed by their district numbers.

Alabama 
 . James Dellet (W)
 . James E. Belser (D)
 . Dixon H. Lewis (D), until April 22, 1844
 William L. Yancey (D), from December 2, 1844
 . William W. Payne (D)
 . George S. Houston (D)
 . Reuben Chapman (D)
 . Felix G. McConnell (D)

Arkansas 
 . Edward Cross (D)

Connecticut 
 . Thomas H. Seymour (D)
 . John Stewart (D)
 . George S. Catlin (D)
 . Samuel Simons (D)

Delaware 
 . George B. Rodney (W)

Florida 
 : Vacant from March 3, 1845 admission

Georgia 
All representatives were elected statewide on a general ticket.
 . Edward J. Black (D)
 . Howell Cobb (D)
 . Mark A. Cooper (D), until June 26, 1843
 Alexander H. Stephens (W), from October 2, 1843
 . Hugh A. Haralson (D)
 . John B. Lamar (D), until July 29, 1843
 Absalom H. Chappell (W), from October 2, 1843
 . John H. Lumpkin (D)
 . John Millen (D), until October 15, 1843
 Duncan L. Clinch (W), from February 15, 1844
 . William H. Stiles (D)

Illinois 
 . Robert Smith (D)
 . John A. McClernand (D)
 . Orlando B. Ficklin (D)
 . John Wentworth (D)
 . Stephen A. Douglas (D)
 . Joseph P. Hoge (D)
 . John J. Hardin (W)

Indiana 
 . Robert D. Owen (D)
 . Thomas J. Henley (D)
 . Thomas Smith (D)
 . Caleb B. Smith (W)
 . William J. Brown (D)
 . John W. Davis (D)
 . Joseph A. Wright (D)
 . John Pettit (D)
 . Samuel C. Sample (W)
 . Andrew Kennedy (D)

Kentucky 
 . Linn Boyd (D)
 . Willis Green (W)
 . Henry Grider (W)
 . George A. Caldwell (D)
 . James W. Stone (D)
 . John White (W)
 . William P. Thomasson (W)
 . Garrett Davis (W)
 . Richard French (D)
 . John W. Tibbatts (D)

Louisiana 
 . John Slidell (D)
 . Alcée L. La Branche (D)
 . John B. Dawson (D)
 . Pierre E. J. B. Bossier (D), until April 24, 1844
 Isaac E. Morse (D), from December 2, 1844

Maine 
 . Joshua Herrick (D)
 . Robert P. Dunlap (D)
 . Luther Severance (W)
 . Freeman H. Morse (W)
 . Benjamin White (D)
 . Hannibal Hamlin (D)
 . Shepard Cary (D)  from May 10, 1844

Maryland 
 . John M. S. Causin (W)
 . Francis Brengle (W)
 . John Wethered (W)
 . John P. Kennedy (W)
 . Jacob A. Preston (W)
 . Thomas A. Spence (W)

Massachusetts 
 . Robert C. Winthrop (W)
 . Daniel P. King (W)
 . Amos Abbott (W)
 . William Parmenter (D)
 . Charles Hudson (W)
 . Osmyn Baker (W)
 . Julius Rockwell (W)
 . John Quincy Adams (W)
 . Henry Williams (D)
 . Barker Burnell (W), until June 15, 1843
 Joseph Grinnell (W), from December 7, 1843

Michigan 
 . Robert McClelland (D)
 . Lucius Lyon (D)
 . James B. Hunt (D)

Mississippi 
All representatives were elected statewide on a general ticket.
 . William H. Hammett (D)
 . Robert W. Roberts (D)
 . Jacob Thompson (D)
 . Tilghman M. Tucker (D)

Missouri 
All representatives were elected statewide on a general ticket.
 . Gustavus M. Bower (D)
 . James B. Bowlin (D)
 . James M. Hughes (D)
 . John Jameson (D)
 . James H. Relfe (D)

New Hampshire 
All representatives were elected statewide on a general ticket.
 . Edmund Burke (D)
 . John P. Hale (D)
 . Moses Norris Jr. (D)
 . John R. Reding (D)

New Jersey 
 . Lucius Q. C. Elmer (D)
 . George Sykes (D)
 . Isaac G. Farlee (D)
 . Littleton Kirkpatrick (D)
 . William Wright (Ind. W)

New York 
 . Selah B. Strong (D)
 . Henry C. Murphy (D)
 . J. Phillips Phoenix (W)
 . William B. Maclay (D)
 . Moses G. Leonard (D)
 . Hamilton Fish (W)
 . Joseph H. Anderson (D)
 . Richard D. Davis (D)
 . James G. Clinton (D)
 . Jeremiah Russell (D)
 . Zadock Pratt (D)
 . David L. Seymour (D)
 . Daniel D. Barnard (W)
 . Charles Rogers (W)
 . Lemuel Stetson (D)
 . Chesselden Ellis (D)
 . Charles S. Benton (D)
 . Preston King (D)
 . Orville Hungerford (D)
 . Samuel Beardsley (D), until February 29, 1844
 Levi D. Carpenter (D), from November 5, 1844
 . Jeremiah E. Cary (D)
 . Smith M. Purdy (D)
 . Orville Robinson (D)
 . Horace Wheaton (D)
 . George O. Rathbun (D)
 . Amasa Dana (D)
 . Byram Green (D)
 . Thomas J. Paterson (W)
 . Charles H. Carroll (W)
 . William S. Hubbell (D)
 . Asher Tyler (W)
 . William A. Moseley (W)
 . Albert Smith (W)
 . Washington Hunt (W)

North Carolina 
 . Thomas L. Clingman (W)
 . Daniel M. Barringer (W)
 . David S. Reid (D)
 . Edmund Deberry (W)
 . Romulus M. Saunders (D)
 . James I. McKay (D)
 . John R. J. Daniel (D)
 . Archibald H. Arrington (D)
 . Kenneth Rayner (W)

Ohio 
 . Alexander Duncan (D)
 . John B. Weller (D)
 . Robert C. Schenck (W)
 . Joseph Vance (W)
 . Emery D. Potter (D)
 . Henry St. John (D)
 . Joseph J. McDowell (D)
 . John I. Vanmeter (W)
 . Elias Florence (W)
 . Heman Allen Moore (D), until April 3, 1844
 Alfred P. Stone (D), from October 8, 1844
 . Jacob Brinkerhoff (D)
 . Samuel F. Vinton (W)
 . Perley B. Johnson (W)
 . Alexander Harper (W)
 . Joseph Morris (D)
 . James Mathews (D)
 . William C. McCauslen (D)
 . Ezra Dean (D)
 . Daniel R. Tilden (W)
 . Joshua R. Giddings (W)
 . Henry R. Brinkerhoff (D), until April 30, 1844
 Edward S. Hamlin (W), from October 8, 1844

Pennsylvania 
 . Edward Joy Morris (W)
 . Joseph R. Ingersoll (W)
 . John T. Smith (D)
 . Charles J. Ingersoll (D)
 . Jacob S. Yost (D)
 . Michael H. Jenks (W)
 . Abraham R. McIlvaine (W)
 . Jeremiah Brown (W)
 . John Ritter (D)
 . Richard Brodhead (D)
 . Benjamin A. Bidlack (D)
 . Almon H. Read (D), until June 3, 1844
 George Fuller (D), from December 2, 1844
 . Henry Frick (W), until March 1, 1844
 James Pollock (W), from April 5, 1844
 . Alexander Ramsey (W)
 . Henry Nes (Ind. D)
 . James Black (D)
 . James Irvin (W)
 . Andrew Stewart (W)
 . Henry D. Foster (D)
 . John Dickey (W)
 . William Wilkins (D), until February 14, 1844
 Cornelius Darragh (W), from March 26, 1844
 . Samuel Hays (D)
 . Charles M. Reed (W)
 . Joseph Buffington (W)

Rhode Island 
 . Henry Y. Cranston (LO)
 . Elisha R. Potter Jr. (LO)

South Carolina 
 . James A. Black (D)
 . Richard F. Simpson (D)
 . Joseph A. Woodward (D)
 . John Campbell (D)
 . Armistead Burt (D)
 . Isaac E. Holmes (D)
 . Robert Rhett (D)

Tennessee 
 . Andrew Johnson (D)
 . William T. Senter (W)
 . Julius W. Blackwell (D)
 . Alvan Cullom (D)
 . George W. Jones (D)
 . Aaron V. Brown (D)
 . David W. Dickinson (W)
 . Joseph H. Peyton (W)
 . Cave Johnson (D)
 . John B. Ashe (W)
 . Milton Brown (W)

Vermont 
 . Solomon Foot (W)
 . Jacob Collamer (W)
 . George P. Marsh (W)
 . Paul Dillingham Jr. (D)

Virginia 
 . Archibald Atkinson (D)
 . George C. Dromgoole (D)
 . Walter Coles (D)
 . Edmund W. Hubard (D)
 . Thomas W. Gilmer (D), until February 16, 1844
 William L. Goggin (W), from April 25, 1844
 . John W. Jones (D)
 . Henry A. Wise (D), until February 12, 1844
 Thomas H. Bayly (D), from May 6, 1844
 . Willoughby Newton (W)
 . Samuel Chilton (W)
 . William Lucas (D)
 . William Taylor (D)
 . Augustus A. Chapman (D)
 . George W. Hopkins (D)
 . George W. Summers (W)
 . Lewis Steenrod (D)

Non-voting members
 . David Levy Yulee (D), until March 3, 1845
 . Augustus C. Dodge (D)
 . Henry Dodge (D)

Changes in membership
The count below reflects changes from the beginning of the first session of this Congress.

Senate 
 Replacements: 7
 Democrats (D): no net change
 Whigs (W): 1 seat net loss
 Law and Order (LO): 1 seat net gain
 Deaths: 3
 Resignations: 5
 Interim appointments: 1
Total seats with changes: 10

|-
| Tennessee(1)
| Vacant
| Senator Alfred O. P. Nicholson (D) resigned in 26th Congress.Successor elected October 17, 1843.
|  | Ephraim H. Foster (W)
| Elected October 17, 1843

|-
| Tennessee(2)
| Vacant
| Failure to elect.Successor elected October 17, 1843.
|  | Spencer Jarnagin (W)
| Elected October 17, 1843

|-
| Maine(1)
| Vacant
| Senator Reuel Williams (D) resigned in previous congress.Successor elected December 4, 1843.
|  | John Fairfield (D)
| Elected December 4, 1843

|-
| Louisiana(3)
|  | Alexander Porter (W)
| Elected but, due to ill health, never took his seat.Incumbent died January 13, 1844.Successor elected February 12, 1844.
|  | Henry Johnson (W)
| Elected February 12, 1844

|-
| Illinois(2)
|  | Samuel McRoberts (D)
| Died March 27, 1843.Successor appointed December 4, 1843, to continue the term until an election.Appointee was later elected, on an unknown date.
|  | James Semple (D)
| Seated December 4, 1843

|-
| Missouri(3)
|  | Lewis F. Linn (D)
| Died October 3, 1843.Successor appointed October 14, 1843, to continue the term until an election.Appointee was later elected, on an unknown date in 1843.
|  | David R. Atchison (D)
| Seated October 14, 1843

|-
| Rhode Island(1)
|  | William Sprague (W)
| Resigned January 17, 1844.Successor elected January 25, 1844.
|  | John B. Francis (LO)
| Seated January 25, 1844

|-
| Alabama(2)
|  | William R. King (D)
| Resigned April 15, 1844, after being appointed U.S. Minister to France.Successor appointed April 22, 1844, to finish the term.
|  | Dixon H. Lewis (D)
| Seated April 22, 1844

|-
| New York(1)
|  | Nathaniel P. Tallmadge (W)
| Resigned June 17, 1844, after being appointed Governor of Wisconsin Territory.Successor was appointed November 30, 1945.Appointee was later elected January 18, 1845.
|  | Daniel S. Dickinson (D)
| Seated December 9, 1844

|-
| Arkansas(2)
|  | William S. Fulton (D)
| Died August 15, 1844.Successor elected November 8, 1844.
|  | Chester Ashley (D)
| Seated November 8, 1844

|-
| New York(3)
|  | Silas Wright (D)
| Resigned November 26, 1844, after being elected Governor of New York.Successor appointed November 30, 1945. 
|  | Henry A. Foster (D)
| Seated December 9, 1844

|-
| New York(3)
|  | Henry A. Foster (D)
| Appointee was not nominated for election.Successor elected January 18, 1845.
|  | John A. Dix (D)
| Seated January 27, 1845

|-
| South Carolina(2)
|  | Daniel E. Huger (D)
| Resigned March 3, 1845
| Vacant
| Not filled this term

|-
| Florida(1)
| colspan=2 | New state: Florida admitted to the Union March 3, 1845.First Senator wasn't elected until the next Congress.
| Vacant
| Not filled this term

|-
| Florida(2)
| colspan=2 | New state: Florida admitted to the Union March 3, 1845.First Senator wasn't elected until the next Congress.
| Vacant
| Not filled this term

|}

House of Representatives
 Replacements: 14
 Democrats (D): 6 seat net loss
 Whigs (W): 6 seat net gain
 Deaths: 7
 Resignations: 7
 Contested election: 0
Total seats with changes: 16

|-
| 
|  | Barker Burnell (W)
| style="font-size:80%" | Died June 15, 1843
|  | Joseph Grinnell (W)
| Seated December 7, 1843
|-
| 
|  | Mark A. Cooper (D)
| style="font-size:80%" | Resigned June 26, 1843, to become candidate for Governor of Georgia
|  | Alexander H. Stephens (W)
| Seated October 2, 1843
|-
| 
|  | John B. Lamar (D)
| style="font-size:80%" | Resigned July 29, 1843
|  | Absalom H. Chappell (W)
| Seated October 2, 1843
|-
| 
|  | John Millen (D)
| style="font-size:80%" | Died October 15, 1843
|  | Duncan L. Clinch (W)
| Seated February 15, 1844
|-
| 
|  | Henry A. Wise (D)
| style="font-size:80%" | Resigned February 12, 1844, after being appointed Minister to Brazil
|  | Thomas H. Bayly (D)
| Seated May 6, 1844
|-
| 
|  | William Wilkens (D)
| style="font-size:80%" | Resigned February 14, 1844, after being appointed United States Secretary of War
|  | Cornelius Darragh (W)
| Seated March 26, 1844
|-
| 
|  | Thomas W. Gilmer (D)
| style="font-size:80%" | Resigned February 16, 1844, after being appointed United States Secretary of the Navy
|  | William L. Goggin (W)
| Seated April 25, 1844
|-
| 
|  | Henry Frick (W)
| style="font-size:80%" | Died March 1, 1844
|  | James Pollock (W)
| Seated April 5, 1844
|-
| 
|  | Heman A. Moore (D)
| style="font-size:80%" | Died April 3, 1844
|  | Alfred P. Stone (D)
| Seated October 8, 1844
|-
| 
|  | Dixon H. Lewis (D)
| style="font-size:80%" | Resigned April 22, 1844, after being appointed US Senator
|  | William L. Yancey (D)
| Seated December 2, 1844
|-
| 
|  | Pierre Bossier (D)
| style="font-size:80%" | Died April 24, 1844
|  | Isaac E. Morse (D)
| Seated December 2, 1844
|-
| 
|  | Samuel Beardsley (D)
| style="font-size:80%" | Resigned February 29, 1844, after being appointed associate judge of New York Supreme Court
|  | Levi D. Carpenter (D)
| Seated November 5, 1844
|-
| 
|  | Henry R. Brinkerhoff (D)
| style="font-size:80%" | Died April 30, 1844
|  | Edward S. Hamlin (W)
| Seated October 8, 1844
|-
| 
|  | Almon H. Read (D)
| style="font-size:80%" | Died June 3, 1844
|  | George Fuller (D)
| Seated December 2, 1844
|-
| 
|  | David L. Yulee (D)
| colspan=3 style="font-size:80%" | Seat was eliminated when Florida achieved statehood March 3, 1845
|-
| nowrap | 
| colspan=2 style="font-size:80%" | Florida was admitted to the Union on March 3, 1845
| Vacant
| Not filled this term
|}

Committees
Lists of committees and their party leaders.

Senate

House of Representatives

Joint committees

 Enrolled Bills
 The Library 
 Smithsonian Bequest

Employees 
 Librarian of Congress: John Silva Meehan

Senate
 Chaplain: Septimus Tustin (Presbyterian)
 Secretary: Asbury Dickins
 Sergeant at Arms: Edward Dyer

House of Representatives 
 Chaplain: Isaac S. Tinsley (Baptist), elected December 16, 1843
 William M. Daily (Methodist), from December 4, 1844
 Clerk: Matthew St. Clair Clarke, until December 7, 1843
 Caleb J. McNulty, elected December 7, 1843
 Benjamin B. French, elected January 18, 1845
 Doorkeeper: Jesse E. Dow, elected December 7, 1843
 Postmaster: William J. McCormick, until January 4, 1844
 John M. Johnson, from January 4, 1844
 Reading Clerks: 
 Sergeant at Arms: Eleazor M. Townsend, until December 8, 1843
 Newton Lane, from December 8, 1843

See also 
 1842 United States elections (elections leading to this Congress)
 1842–43 United States Senate elections
 1842–43 United States House of Representatives elections
 1844 United States elections (elections during this Congress, leading to the next Congress)
 1844 United States presidential election
 1844–45 United States Senate elections
 1844–45 United States House of Representatives elections

Notes

References

External links
Statutes at Large, 1789-1875
Senate Journal, First Forty-three Sessions of Congress
House Journal, First Forty-three Sessions of Congress
Biographical Directory of the U.S. Congress
U.S. House of Representatives: House History
U.S. Senate: Statistics and Lists